Williams Farm is a historic home and farm complex located at Rhinebeck, Dutchess County, New York.  The farmhouse was built about 1835 and is a -story, five-bay frame building in the Greek Revival style. It is topped by a gable roof and sits on a slightly raised stone foundation. It features a 1-story, flat-roof front porch with square, Doric order columns.  Also on the property are three contributing barns, two stone walls, a pond / dam, and a guest cottage.

It was added to the National Register of Historic Places in 1987.

See also

National Register of Historic Places listings in Rhinebeck, New York

References

Farms on the National Register of Historic Places in New York (state)
Greek Revival houses in New York (state)
Houses completed in 1835
Houses in Rhinebeck, New York
National Register of Historic Places in Dutchess County, New York